Felix Horn Myhre (born 4 March 1999) is a Norwegian football player who plays as midfielder for the Eliteserien club Brann.

Career statistics

Club

References

External links
 

1999 births
Living people
Norwegian footballers
Norway under-21 international footballers
Norway youth international footballers
Eliteserien players
Norwegian Second Division players
Norwegian Third Division players
Vålerenga Fotball players
FK Bodø/Glimt players
SK Brann players
Association football midfielders